Malou Hansson (born 1983 in Järfälla, Uppland, Sweden) served as Miss Sweden in 2002. She was the first woman with black African ancestry to hold this beauty pageant title.

Hansson, competing as "Miss Uppland", was suggested as a potential candidate for the Miss Universe pageant by a celebrity panel, and the viewers selected her as the winner via a telephone poll.  She served as Sweden's representative in the Miss Universe 2002 pageant but she did not place in the top 10.

Hansson, while the first woman of African ancestry to win the crown, was not the first woman of African ancestry to compete for the title of Miss Sweden. Other black Miss Sweden-contestants during the years have included such as Jessica Folcker (2nd R-UP 1993), Ida Sofia Manneh (1st R-UP 2001) and her own sister Nanna Hansson in 2001.

Film career
Since her time as Miss Sweden ended, Hansson has appeared in several Swedish films in small roles. These include Stockholm Boogie (2005), Blodsbröder (2005), and Sökarna: Återkomsten (2006). In 2007 Hansson performed her first leading movie role as "Nathalie" in the Swedish movie Gangster, alongside actors Kjell Bergqvist and Mikael Persbrandt.

References

External links
 

1983 births
Living people
People from Järfälla Municipality
Swedish people of Ghanaian descent
Miss Sweden winners
Miss Universe 2002 contestants
Swedish film actresses